Cesare Bossi (1773—September 1802) was an Italian-born composer. He is most known as a composer of ballets which he wrote for the King's Theatre in Haymarket in London.

Career

Bossi was born in Ferrara in 1773.

None of the sources provide information about his training or early career.  One source states that while in Italy he wrote operas as well as piano music including sonatas.

In 1795 he emigrated to London. There he became associated with the King's Theatre in Haymarket where he was a composer of ballets, a conductor, and responsible for the musical preparation of operas. "In this task there have been few who could excel him." His association with the theatre lasted from 1795 to 1796 through the 1799–1800 season. Most of his ballets were written between 1796 and 1800. It was said that he composed with "unexampled rapidity." and that his melodies were of high quality.

He married a Mademoise del Caro, a dancer in the company.  She began to be billed as "Madame Bossi" as of 6 February 1796.  By 2 June 1800 the couple were living at No. 1 Great Suffolk Street.

In September 1802, the Monthly Mirror reported that Bossi had died in the King's Bench Prison "of a deep decline." The paper called him "A musical professor of eminent talents." He left his widow Del Caro and four children.

List of works

Ballets

Other works
Overture to Blue Beard (opera by Michael Kelly) (most vocal scores of the opera have Kelly's own overture)
Pas de trois from La fille mal gardée (bulk of ballet composed by unidentified composer, 18 April 1799)
Hornpipe from Barbara and Allen (ballet by James Harvey D'Egville)
Variations, D minor, piano

References

External links

1773 births
1802 deaths
Ballet in London
Italian male classical composers